Suppiluliuma I or Suppiluliumas I was king of the Hittites (r. c. 1370–1330 BC (middle chronology) or 1344–1322 BC (short chronology)). He achieved fame as a great warrior and statesman, successfully challenging the then-dominant Egyptian Empire for control of the lands between the Mediterranean and the Euphrates.

Early life
Suppiluliuma was the son of Tudhaliya II and Queen Daduhepa. He began his career as the chief advisor and general to Tudhaliya II, then based at Samuha. In this capacity, he defeated the Hittites' enemies among the Azzi-Hayasa and the Kaskas. Both enemies then united around charismatic leaders to counter him; of these Karanni founded a semblance of a royal court in Hayasa, and Piyapili failed to do likewise for the Kaska. Suppiluliuma and Tudhaliya defeated these threats in turn, to the extent that the Hittite court could settle in Hattusa again.

When Tudhaliya II died, Tudhaliya the Younger succeeded to the throne. Soon after his accession, however, he was overthrown and succeeded by his younger brother Suppiluliuma. Some of the Hittite priests later reported this to Suppiluliumas's son, successor, and biographer Mursili II, holding it out as an outstanding crime of the whole dynasty.

Reign

Suppiluliuma married a sister to the Hayasan king Hukkana, and his daughter Muwatti to Maskhuiluwa of the Arzawan state Mira. He also married a Babylonian princess and retook Arzawan territory as far as Hapalla. His most permanent victory was against the Mitanni kingdom, which he reduced to a client state under his son-in-law Shattiwazza. He was also a master builder of large stone structures decorated with stone reliefs. It was during his reign that concepts of the sacred nature of royal leaders developed.

Suppiluliuma then took advantage of the tumultuous reign of the Pharaoh Akhenaten, and seized control of Egyptian territory in Syria, inciting many Egyptian vassals to revolt.

His success encouraged the widow (who is called Dakhamunzu in the annals) of the Egyptian king Nibhururiya (usually identified with Tutankhamun) to write to him, asking him to send one of his sons to be her husband and rule Egypt, since she had no heir and was on the verge of being forced to marry "a servant", usually thought to be the Egyptian general Horemheb or her late husband's vizier Ay. Suppiluliuma dispatched an ambassador to Egypt to investigate; he reported that the situation was accurately described, and the king decided to take advantage of this windfall.  Unfortunately, Prince Zannanza died on the way, and the marriage alliance never came to be. Angry letters were exchanged between Suppiluliuma and the Pharaoh Ay, who had assumed the Egyptian throne, over the circumstances of Zannanza's death and the allegation that he had been murdered by Egyptians.

Suppiluliuma was furious at this turn of events and unleashed his armies against Egypt's vassal states in Canaan and Northern Syria, capturing much territory.

Unfortunately, many of the Egyptian prisoners carried a plague which would eventually ravage the Hittite heartland and lead to the deaths of both Suppiluliuma I and his successor, Arnuwanda II.

Family
Suppiluliuma had two wives. The first wife who served as his queen was a woman named Henti. A badly damaged text from the reign of her son Mursili II implies that Queen Henti may have been banished by her husband to the land of Ahhiyawa. An advantageous marriage with a Babylonian princess might have resulted in her banishment. She is likely the mother of all of Suppiluliuma's sons.

 Arnuwanda II, a king of the Hittite Empire (new kingdom) c. 1330 BC
 Telipinu, who is known from a decree appointing him as a priest of Kizzuwadna. 
 Piyassili, later known as Sarri-Kusuh and governor of the former territory of Hanigabat west of the Euphrates
 Mursili II, a king of the Hittite Empire (New kingdom) c. 1330–1295 BC
 Zannanza, the Hittite prince who was sent to Egypt in response to the Dakhamunzu letter and possibly murdered en route.
After Henti's disappearance, the next queen is a Babylonian princess named Malnigal. She is the daughter of King Burna-Buriash II. Malnigal adopts the title Tawananna as her personal name.

Suppiluliuma is known to have had at least one daughter. Her name was Muwatti.

Sources
The Deeds of Suppiluliuma, compiled after his death by his son Mursili, is an important primary source for the king's reign. One of Suppiluliuma's letters, addressed to Akhenaten, was preserved in the Amarna letters (EA 41) archive at Akhetaten. It expresses his hope that the good relations which existed between Egypt and Hatti under Akhenaten's father (Amenhotep III) would continue into Akhenaten's new reign.

"In relating the wars of his father Suppiluliuma I and his victories the Hittite king Mursili II mentions that after the death of the king of Egypt Tutankamon, Queen Dahamunzu (Nefertiti) asked his father to send a prince to become her husband and king from the country. When the inhabitants of Egypt heard about Amqa's attack, they were afraid because to make matters worse their king Tutankhamun had just died, the widowed Queen of Egypt sent a message to my father saying the following: "My husband is dead and I do not have a son. It is said that you have many sons, if you sent one, he could be my husband. "When my father learned that he summoned the Great Council. He decided to send Hattu-Zili, the chamberlain, went to him saying I am sure of information "During the absence of Hattu-Zili in Egypt, my father conquered the city of Kargamis. The Egyptian envoy, the Honorable Hani, came to see him. The Queen sent her letter saying, "Why do you say do not deceive me that way? If I had a son would I write to a foreign country in such a humiliating way for me and my country? Give me one of your sons and he will be my husband and the king of Egypt. " because my father had a good heart, he accepted the lady's wish and decided to send his son".

In fiction
Suppiluliuma I appears in Mika Waltari's historical novel The Egyptian, in which he is presented as the ultimate villain, a ruthless conqueror and utterly tyrannical ruler. Popular culture researcher Abe Brown notes that "As Waltari's book was written during the Second World War, Suppiluliuma's depiction is likely to be at least in part inspired by Hitler, rather than by historical facts. Unlike quite a few other historical figures of many times and places who got cast in the role of Hitler, Suppiluliuma has not yet attracted the attention of any historical novelist to write a bit more nuanced popular account—though his life certainly offers rich untapped material".

Janet Morris wrote a detailed biographical novel, I, the Sun, whose subject was Suppiluliuma I, in which all characters are from the historical record, about which O.M. Gurney, Hittite scholar and author of The Hittites, commented that "the author is familiar with every aspect of Hittite culture".

Suppiluliuma appears in a minor role in the novel The Shadow Prince by Philip Armstrong, as the grandfather of the hero, Tupiluliuma, in which he is Tudhaliya's nephew and adopted son. It is explained that he was reluctantly forced to take the throne and exclude his adoptive brother, the younger Tudhaliyas, as a result of his predecessor's descent into madness. He is regarded as one of the greatest of the Great Kings of Hatti, but is not a man to be crossed lightly.

He is also a character in the historical fiction manga Red River, introduced as an old man who has retired from warfare. He dies shortly after the start of the story.

Suppilulima may be depicted in the 'Nantucket' novels of S.M. Stirling, but under an alternative name, with a son called Kalkash.

See also

 Piyashshili
 Suppiluliuma II
 Zita (Hittite prince), brother of Suppiluliuma

References

Literature

External links 
 
 
 

1320s BC deaths
Hittite kings
Amarna letters writers
14th-century BC rulers
Year of birth unknown